The Divisiones Regionales de Fútbol in Ceuta and Melilla, both at Level 6 of the Spanish football pyramid:
Preferente de Ceuta, 1 Group, organized by Ceuta Football Federation
Primera Autonómica de Melilla, 1 Group, organized by Melilla Football Federation

League chronology
Timeline - Ceuta

Timeline - Melilla

Preferente of Ceuta

The Preferente de Ceuta stands at the sixth level of Spanish football and is the only league played exclusively within the autonomous city of Ceuta. At the end of the season, the top four clubs advance to promotion playoff. The winner plays the champion of the Primera Autonómica de Melilla for promotion to the Tercera División RFEF (to Group 10, played by teams from ). Federation rules allow the playoff winner to be promoted directly if there is no Ceuta club in the Tercera RFEF.

2021–22 teams

Champions

Primera Autonómica de Melilla

The Primera Autonómica de Melilla stands at the sixth level of Spanish football and is the only league played exclusively within the autonomous city of Melilla. The champion competes against the playoff winner from the Regional Preferente de Ceuta for promotion to the Tercera División RFEF (to Group 9, played by teams from ). Federation rules allows the champion to be promoted directly if there is no Melilla club in the Tercera División.

2021–22 teams

Champions

External links
Football Federation of Ceuta
Football Federation of Melilla

Sport in Melilla
Sport in Ceuta
Ceuta and Melilla

es:Preferente de Ceuta